David Njitock (born 17 June 1942) is a Cameroonian sprinter. He competed in the men's 100 metres at the 1964 Summer Olympics.

References

1942 births
Living people
Athletes (track and field) at the 1964 Summer Olympics
Cameroonian male sprinters
Olympic athletes of Cameroon
Place of birth missing (living people)
20th-century Cameroonian people